The 2018–19 season was Burton Albion's 69th season in their history and their second in League One, following relegation from the Championship, the previous season. Along with competing in the League One, the club also participated in the FA Cup, League Cup and League Trophy. The season ran from 1 July 2018 to 30 June 2019.

Squad

Statistics

|-
!colspan=14|Player(s) who left the club during the season:

|}

Goals record

Disciplinary record

Transfers

Transfers in

Loans in

Transfers out

Loans out

Competitions

Pre-season friendlies
Burton confirmed friendlies with Mickleover Sports, Kidderminster Harriers, Aston Villa, Solihull Moors, Alfreton Town, Cardiff City and Matlock Town.

EFL League One

League table

Results summary

Results by matchday

Matches

FA Cup

The first round draw was made live on BBC by Dennis Wise and Dion Dublin on 22 October.

EFL Cup

On 15 June 2018, the draw for the first round was made in Vietnam. The second round draw was made from the Stadium of Light on 16 August. The third round draw was made on 30 August 2018 by David Seaman and Joleon Lescott. The fourth round draw was made live on Quest by Rachel Yankey and Rachel Riley on 29 September. The draw for the quarter-final was made live on Sky Sports by Jamie Redknapp and Jimmy Floyd Hasselbaink on 31 October. The semi-final draw was made live on Sky Sports by Piers Morgan and Peter Crouch on 19 December 2018.

EFL Trophy
On 13 July 2018, the initial group stage draw bar the U21 invited clubs was announced.

References

Burton Albion F.C. seasons
Burton Albion